The Bishop of Portsmouth is the Ordinary of the Church of England Diocese of Portsmouth in the Province of Canterbury.

The diocese covers south-east Hampshire and the Isle of Wight and has its see in the City of Portsmouth, where the seat is located at the Cathedral Church of Saint Thomas of Canterbury which was elevated to cathedral status in 1927. The bishop's residence is Bishopsgrove, Fareham.

The office of bishop was created in 1927 when the new diocese was formed from part of the Diocese of Winchester. Jonathan Frost has been the Bishop of Portsmouth since his election was confirmed on 18 January 2022. He was installed as the tenth Bishop of Portsmouth on 12 March 2022.

List of Anglican Bishops of Portsmouth

Assistant bishops
Among those called "Assistant Bishop of Portsmouth" have been:
1939–1959 (ret.): Arthur Kitching, Vicar of Holy Trinity Fareham (until 1945), then Archdeacon of Portsmouth (until 1952), former Bishop on the Upper Nile
1959–1967 (ret.): Bryan Robin, retired Bishop of Adelaide

References 

 
Portsmouth
Bishops of Portsmouth
Anglican Diocese of Portsmouth
Bishops of Portsmouth